Duboscq is a French surname. People with the name include:

 Genevieve Duboscq (1933–2018), author
 Hugues Duboscq (born 1981), Olympic breaststroke swimmer
 Jules Duboscq (18171886), instrument maker, inventor, and photographer
 Lucien Duboscq (1893–1935, stage actor
 Octave Duboscq (1868–1943), zoologist, mycologist and parasitologist

See also
 Dubosc